Regional Medical Research Center, Bhubaneswar Or RMRC, Bhubaneswar (also known as ICMR-RMRCBB)  is an organization in the field of Medical research, established in Bhubaneswar, Odisha. It was established in 1981 by the Indian Council of Medical Research (ICMR), New Delhi. The main focus area of research of the institute is on locally prevailing communicable and non-communicable diseases, tribal health and malnutrition in Odisha and adjoining states. It has Sanhamitra Pati as Director.

References

External links
Official Website

Medical research institutes in India
Research institutes in Bhubaneswar
Indian Council of Medical Research
Medical colleges in Odisha
Universities and colleges in Bhubaneswar
Research institutes established in 1981
1981 establishments in Orissa